Andrea Medina Martín (born 11 May 2004) is a Spanish professional footballer who plays as a defender for Atlético Madrid.

Club career
Medina started her career at Camas' youth academy.

References

External links
Profile at La Liga

2004 births
Living people
Women's association football defenders
Spanish women's footballers
Footballers from Seville
Real Betis Féminas players
Primera División (women) players
Spain women's youth international footballers